Howard Kelly "Jack" Fincher (December 6, 1930 – April 10, 2003) was an American screenwriter and journalist who had written for various magazines and periodicals, notably serving as San Francisco Bureau Chief of Life magazine. He is the father of film director David Fincher.

Life and work
Fincher was born in Bonham, Texas, the son of Grace Mae (Hutcheson) and Murlin Jackson Fincher, and was raised in Oklahoma. After graduating from high school in 1949, Fincher spent two years attending the University of Tulsa, also writing for the Tulsa World. He then enlisted in the United States Air Force. In 1960, he married Claire Mae Boettcher, a mental health nurse from South Dakota who worked in drug addiction programs; their son is acclaimed film director David Fincher. In 1964, when David was two, the family moved from Denver, Colorado to San Anselmo, California, where filmmaker George Lucas was one of their neighbors.

Fincher once wrote a Howard Hughes biopic before his script was ultimately merged into the project that became The Aviator instead. He also wrote The Brain: Mystery of Matter and Mind He wrote the screenplay for Mank, a biographical film about screenwriter Herman J. Mankiewicz, which earned him a Golden Globe Award nomination. Originally set to be filmed in the late 1990s, the script was not produced until his son David began filming in 2019. Starring Gary Oldman in the title role, the film was released by Netflix in 2020, to positive reception. The screenplay earned Fincher a posthumous nomination for the BAFTA Award for Best Original Screenplay, 16 years after his death.

Jack Fincher died in Los Angeles on April 10, 2003, at the age of 72, following a year-long battle with cancer.

References

External links
 

1930 births
2003 deaths
People from Bonham, Texas
20th-century American journalists
American male journalists
20th-century American screenwriters